Edward Page Heffernan (16 May 1869 – 16 May 1904) was an Australian rules footballer who played with Carlton in the Victorian Football League (VFL).

Family
The son of Thomas Heffernan, and Mary Heffernan, née Minogue, Edward Page Heffernan was born at Gisborne, Victoria on 16 May 1869.

Football

Carlton (VFA)
Recruited from Fitzroy Juniors in 1894, he played at least 23 senior games for Carlton in the VFA over three seasons (1894 to 1896).

Carlton (VFL)
He played 2 senior games for Carlton in the VFL, including the team's first-ever match in the VFL's inaugural season, against Fitzroy, at the Brunswick Street Oval, on 8 May 1897.

Notes

References

External links 

Ted Heffernan's profile at Blueseum

1869 births
1904 deaths
Australian rules footballers from Victoria (Australia)
Carlton Football Club (VFA) players
Carlton Football Club players
People from Gisborne, Victoria